Francis Louis of Palatinate-Neuburg (18 July 1664 – 6 April 1732) was bishop and archbishop of several dioceses, prince-elector of the Holy Roman Empire, and  of the Teutonic Order.

Life

He was born in Neuburg an der Donau as son of Philip William, Elector Palatine and Landgravine Elisabeth Amalie of Hesse-Darmstadt.

In 1683, he became Prince-Bishop of Breslau (Wrocław) after the death of his brother Wolfgang Georg, who should have held this office.

In 1694, he assumed the additional offices of Hochmeister of the Teutonic Order and Prince-Bishop of Worms. 1716, he became Archbishop-Elector of Trier. During his regency in Trier, he reorganized the jurisdiction in the diocese and advanced the renovation of the Roman Moselle bridge and the cathedral. He became Archbishop-Elector of Mainz in 1729, giving up the position in Trier as the Pope had prohibited a merging of the two Archbishoprics. In Mainz, Franz Ludwig also started some administrative and judicial reforms as well as the construction of the Deutschhaus.

Franz Ludwig died in Breslau (Wrocław) and is buried there in a specially built chapel in Wrocław Cathedral.

Ancestry

Bibliography
Alessandro Cont, La Chiesa dei principi. Le relazioni tra Reichskirche, dinastie sovrane tedesche e stati italiani (1688-1763), preface of Elisabeth Garms-Cornides, Trento, Provincia autonoma di Trento, 2018, pp. 103–138, https://www.academia.edu/38170694/La_Chiesa_dei_principi._Le_relazioni_tra_Reichskirche_dinastie_sovrane_tedesche_e_stati_italiani_1688-1763_prefazione_di_Elisabeth_Garms-Cornides_Trento_Provincia_autonoma_di_Trento_2018

External links 

  

|-

1664 births
1732 deaths
People from Neuburg an der Donau
Archbishop-Electors of Mainz
Roman Catholic bishops of Worms
Francis 01
House of Wittelsbach
Grand Masters of the Teutonic Order
Prince-Bishops of Breslau
Sons of monarchs